Stanislav Petrík (born 4 August 1977) is a Slovak former professional ice hockey player who played with HC Slovan Bratislava in the Slovak Extraliga.

References

1977 births
Living people
HC Slovan Bratislava players
Dauphins d'Épinal players
Slovak ice hockey goaltenders
HK Nitra players
Slovak expatriate ice hockey people
Expatriate ice hockey players in France
Expatriate ice hockey players in Kazakhstan
Slovak expatriate sportspeople in France
Slovak expatriate sportspeople in Kazakhstan
Yertis Pavlodar players
Slovak ice hockey coaches